Vernonia ampandrandavensis is a species of perennial plant in the family Asteraceae. It is endemic to Madagascar.

References 

ampandrandavensis
Endemic flora of Madagascar
Taxa named by Jean-Henri Humbert